The Melodi Grand Prix Junior 2011 was Norway's tenth national Melodi Grand Prix Junior for young singers aged 8 to 15. It was held in Oslo Spektrum, Oslo, Norway and broadcast live Norwegian Broadcasting Corporation (NRK).

The winner was Sval Rosenløw Eeg, known as Sval, with the song "Trenger deg" (Norwegian for Need you).

Results

First round

Super Final
The exact number of public votes was unknown. Only the winner was announced.

References

External links
Official website

Melodi Grand Prix Junior
Music festivals in Norway